Stade Français Football is a French association football team based in Paris and playing in suburb town of Vaucresson. The team is the football section of sports club Stade Français, whose rugby union section is currently the most successful.

The team currently plays at the Haras Lupine sports center in Vaucresson (Hauts-de-Seine), in the nearby western suburbs of Paris.

The club has repeatedly merged with Île-de-France clubs in its history, once with the Cercle athletétique de Paris between 1942 and 1944 and once with the Red Star to form the Stade français-Red Star between 1948 and 1950. Stade Francais played its matches at the Paris stadium called "Bauer stadium" in Saint-Ouen (Seine-Saint-Denis) after the war, then at the Parc des Princes until 1968 and at the Jean-Bouin stadium in the 70s and 80s when the club evolved at professional and national levels.

The Stade Français experienced its heyday during the post-war period with a semi-final of the Coupe de France in 1949 under the name Stade Français-Red Star and a title of champion of France in the second division in 1952. Thereafter , the club discovered continental struggles with two participations in the Cup of Fair Cities in the 1960s (editions 1964-1965, 1965-1966).

Since the abandonment of professionalism and high-level football in the national and regional divisions in the 1980s, the club has evolved in the lower divisions of the Hauts-de-Seine departmental football district.

History 
Founded in 1883, the Stade Français (which was also a founding member of USFSA), did not have an association football section until 1900, established by Étienne Delavault. The team played at several venues, first at Becon, then at the Vélodrome de la Seine before settling down at La Faisanderie, in the Saint-Cloud area, from 1906. Stade Français took professional status in 1942 

The French football stadium knew its hour of glory from 1945 when the club president set up in Paris a team of professional stars, under the leadership of a legendary pair: Larbi Ben Barek on the field and the mythical Helenio Herrera as coach. Together they entered Division 1 in 1946 and were semi-finalists in the Coupe de France in 1949. However, the club returned to Division 2 the same year. Despite the failure of the merger with the Red Star from 1948 to 1950 to form the "Stade Français–Red Star", the club won its only trophy at today, the title of D2 champion in 1952. The club only stayed 2 years in Division 1, since in 1954, it was relegated after losing the play-offs against the neighbor of Racing, despite the presence in its ranks of Dominique Colonna and Kees Rijvers

Nowadays, the club is member of the Paris Ile-de-France Football League, where it registered in 1990. It takes part in departmental competitions but, after a long period of sports decline, the club becomes ambitious again. So in 2009, under the leadership of its new president, Jean-Pierre Pochon, Stade Français decided to return to high-level competition and set up a more dynamic organization. After repairing his two turf pitches, it simultaneously created a U19 team and a Senior team with the objective of winning titles. To mark the occasion, Stade Français aligned its teams with a brand new jersey specially made to measure and which was reminiscent of the blows from the rugby club. The French stadium goes up for the second consecutive year and is thus in the 4th division of the Hauts-de-Seine departmental football district. The objective is to set up a division each year.

Names 
Through its history, the club has changed its name several times:
 Stade Français (1900–42, 1943–44, 1945–48, 1950–66, 1968–81, 1985–present) 
 Stade-CAP (1942–43)
 Stade-Capitale (1944–45)
 Stade Français-Red Star (1948–50)
 Stade de Paris FC (1966–68)
 Stade Français 92 (1981–85)

International competition

Notable players

French international while playing for the club:

Henri Arnaudeau
Larbi Ben Barek
Georges Carnus
Raoul Chaisaz
Robert Dauphin
Edmond Delfour
Jacques Dhur
Marcel Domingo
Jean Grégoire
André Grillon
Louis Hon
André Lerond
Maryan Synakowski
Zbigniew Gut
Jules Monsallier
Henri Pavillard
Robert Péri
Pierre Ranzoni
Yvon Ségalen
Henri Skiba
Édouard Stachowitz
Jacques Wild
Hakim Chabi (2021-2022)

Managerial history 
Some of the most notable managers of Stade Francais have been:

G. Davidović 
Accard (1942–43)
Rose
Helenio Herrera (1945–48)
André Riou (1948–50)
J. Drugeon (1950)
W. Wolf (1950–51)
Jean Grégoire (1951)
Edmond Delfour (1952 – December 1953)
André Grillon (December 1953 – 1954)
Joseph Mercier (1954–61)
Wadoux + Lerond (1961)
Joseph Mercier (1961)
Léon Rossi (1961 – November 1963)
Henri Priami (November 1963–65)
André Gérard (1965–67)
Alain Avisse (1975–82)
Claude Dusseau (1982–84)
Yves Todorov (1984–85)

Honours

National 
 Division 2 (1): 1951–52
 Championnat de France (1): 1928

Regional 
 Championat de Paris (6): 1925, 1926, 1928, 1954, 1965, 1979
 Coupe de Paris (1): 1978

References

External links

 

Association football clubs established in 1900
 
Football clubs in Paris
Sport in Hauts-de-Seine
1900 establishments in France
Ligue 1 clubs